Blade Runner Black Out 2022 is a 2017 tech-noir cyberpunk anime short film directed by Shinichiro Watanabe and animated by Cygames Pictures. The short is one of three short films, (with 2036: Nexus Dawn and 2048: Nowhere to Run) that serve as prequels to the live-action film Blade Runner 2049. It debuted on 27 September 2017 on Crunchyroll.

Plot 
Three years after the events of Blade Runner, the Tyrell Corporation has developed the new Nexus-8 line of replicants. The models possess open-ended lifespans, like those of humans. Unrest ensues. 
A replicant named Trixie, is assaulted by human thugs. She is rescued by Iggy, a replicant ex-soldier from the planet Calanthe, who deserted after he learned that the enemy were also replicants. He recruits Trixie into an underground freedom replicant movement which sets out to sabotage Tyrell's database and internet tracking, so that replicants can't be so easily hunted. 

Trixie then befriends Ren, a sympathetic human technician in charge of launching nuclear missiles. He agrees to redirect a test missile to detonate over Los Angeles. This will black out the city and, with an electromagnetic pulse, wipe out all electronic data. Trixie and Iggy set out to physically destroy the Tyrell Corporation's servers. Trixie dies in the attempt but the mission succeeds. Servers powering the internet are destroyed and power to Los Angeles are both disabled, permaently. Iggy escapes. He removes his right eye, which can identify him as a replicant.

A global collapse follows. All replicant production scientific activity ends. Tyrell goes bankrupt. The Wallace Corporation acquires Tyrell and restarts production of a new model a decade later.

Cast 

 Jovan Jackson as Iggy Cygnus
 Luci Christian as Trixie
 Bryson Baugus as Ren
 Edward James Olmos as Gaff

See also 
 Blade Runner: Black Lotus

References

External links
 
 Blade Runner Black Out 2022 on YouTube
 

2017 films
2017 anime films
2017 short films
2010s Warner Bros. animated short films
2010s science fiction films
Films directed by Shinichirō Watanabe
Blade Runner (franchise)
Cyberpunk films
2010s dystopian films
Alcon Entertainment films
Warner Bros. short films
Films based on works by Philip K. Dick
Films set in 2022
Films set in Los Angeles
American science fiction short films
Animated cyberpunk films
Japanese neo-noir films
2010s English-language films